The Orthodox-Catholic Church of America (OCCA) is an independent and self-governing Christian syncretic (Eastern Orthodox/Oriental Orthodox/Western Catholic) jurisdiction based in the United States (including the territory of the US Virgin Islands), with clergy also in Canada, Mexico, Brazil, Africa, and Australia. 

The church celebrates predominantly a version of the Western Liturgy (Roman Rite) though some priests also celebrate the Divine Liturgy of St. John Chrysostom (Byzantine Rite) or the Liturgy of Addai and Mari (East Syriac Rite). The OCCA is not associated with the Eastern Orthodox churches whose bishops are members of the Assembly of Canonical Orthodox Bishops of the United States of America.

The OCCA is governed by a synod of diocesan bishops, currently six. The ecclesial purpose of the OCCA is to be a loving, welcoming and inclusive community where all people can attain the fundamental goal of the Orthodox Catholic faith, summed up by St. Maximos the Confessor (580-662 CE) as "All that God is, except for an identity in being, one becomes when one is deified by grace". This is effected through the worship of God in the Holy Trinity and the proclamation and living of the faith as taught in Holy Scripture, the Apostolic tradition, and the first three ecumenical councils of the undivided and ancient church. The church recognizes sacramental ordination of women to the clergy and homosexual marriage.

The OCCA is one of a number of churches practicing Orthodoxy in an American setting. Its worship and beliefs are influenced by Oriental, Eastern, and Western traditions, and considers itself to be one "self-governing" church out of many in the Orthodox tradition.

Clergy and sacraments
The clergy ordained by the denomination operate their ministries independently from the denomination. According to a statement on the OCCA website:

History

The Orthodox-Catholic Church of America was established in the United States in 1892 under the mandate of the Syriac Orthodox Patriarch, Ignatius Peter IV.  The founding archbishop, Joseph René Vilatte (ordained as Mar Timotheus), had been ordained as a priest by Bishop Ernst Herzog of the Old Catholic Church in Bern, Switzerland on June 7, 1885.  Working in the Great Lakes area, predominantly in Wisconsin, Vilatte sought to bring about the return of a Western Rite of Orthodoxy. Fr. Vilatte received both support and opposition in this attempt, but eventually he was consecrated as archbishop for North America, in Colombo, Ceylon (now Sri Lanka) by Archbishop Francis Alvarez with the permission of the Syriac Orthodox Patriarch of Antioch in 1892.

Saints
The OCCA has canonized two saints: St. David Edwards, a former priest of the OCCA, and St. Fr. Mychal Judge, O.F.M., a Catholic Franciscan friar and firehouse chaplain who was the first identified victim of the September 11 attacks in 2001.

Name

In May 1891, Bishop Vladimir (Sokolovsky), the head of the Russian Orthodox Church in the United States, referred to Fr. Vilatte's flock as "true 'Old Catholic-Orthodox Christians' [now] under the patronage of our Church".

See also

Oriental Orthodoxy
Western Rite Orthodoxy
Eastern Orthodox Church
List of Christian denominations

References

Further reading
A.C. Terry-Thomas, The History of the African Orthodox Church (1956) [no place of publication]
Azevedo, Carmo, Patriot & Saint: The Life Story of Father Alvares/Bishop Mar Julius I (Panjim: 1988).
Attwater, Donald. Churches in Communion with Rome. The Christian Churches of the East, Revised ed. Milwaukee, Wisconsin: The Bruce Publishing Co., 1961.
Churches Not in Communion with Rome. The Christian Churches of the East, Revised ed. Milwaukee, Wisconsin: The Bruce Publishing Co., 1961.
Duncan, Rev. Stephen, DMA. A Genre of Hindusthani Music (Bhajans) as Used in the Roman Catholic Church. Lewiston, NY: The Edwin Mellen Press 1999 (Original dissertation published in Memphis, TN and Bandra, India. 1992.)
This We Believe: Basic Tenets of the Orthodox-Catholic Church of America, second edition. Galveston, Texas: OCCA Archdiocese, 2005.
Conciliar Press. What on Earth is the Orthodox Church. Ben Lomond, CA: Conciliar Press, (No date given).
Fortescue, Adrian, The Lesser Eastern Churches. New York: A.M.S. Press, 1972; reprint, London: Catholic Truth Society, 1913.
Hyde, Most Rev. George, (ret.) (Rev. Gordon Fisher, OCCA, ed.).Genesis of the Orthodox Catholic Church of America. Indianapolis, Indiana: Orthodox Catholic Church of America,1993.
Joseph, John. The Nestorians and their Muslim Neighbors. Princeton: Princeton University Press, 1961.
Pothan, S.G. The Syrian Christians of Kerala. Bombay, India: Asta Publishing House, 1963.
Taft, Rev. Robert, S.J. The Liturgy of the Hours in the Christian East. Kerala, India: K.C.M. Press, 1983.
Theriault, Serge A., 2006. Msgr. Rene Vilatte: Community Organizer of Religion (1854–1929). Berkeley: Apocryphile Press.
Trigg, Rev. Michael, ed. et al. An Introduction to Western Rite Orthodoxy. Ben Lomond, CA: Conciliar Press, 1993.
Ware, Kalistos. The Orthodox Church. Revised edition. Penguin, 1993.

External links
Official website

Christian denominations in North America
Religious organizations established in 1892
Christian denominations established in the 19th century
Independent Catholic denominations
Independent Eastern Orthodox denominations
Eastern Orthodox Church bodies in North America
Oriental Orthodox church bodies
Oriental Orthodoxy in the United States